Zoltán Kávay (also spelled Kavai, 23 June 1931 – 10 September 2002) was a Hungarian rower. He competed at the 1956 Summer Olympics in Melbourne with the men's coxless four where they were eliminated in the round one repêchage. He died on 10 September 2002 in Budapest.

References

External links
 

1931 births
2002 deaths
Hungarian male rowers
Olympic rowers of Hungary
Rowers at the 1956 Summer Olympics
People from Sajószentpéter
European Rowing Championships medalists
Sportspeople from Borsod-Abaúj-Zemplén County